Supreme Soviet elections were held in Kazakhstan on 25 March 1990. Of the 360 seats, 270 were directly elected, whilst 90 were selected by public associations. The Communist Party of Kazakhstan won 342 of the 360 seats, with the remainder going to independents. Voter turnout was reported to be 84.0%.

Results

References

1990 in the Kazakh Soviet Socialist Republic
1990 elections in the Soviet Union
Elections in Kazakhstan
Election and referendum articles with incomplete results
1990 elections in Kazakhstan